The Sheffield Children's Hospital is a healthcare facility for children in Broomhill, Sheffield, South Yorkshire, England. It is managed by the Sheffield Children's NHS Foundation Trust.

History

The hospital first opened on 15 November 1876 as a children's infirmary in Brightmore House, on Brook Hill in Sheffield. Two years later it moved to its current site on Western Bank where it was accommodated in a pair of semi-detached houses. By the mid 1890s it was decided that the two old house were inadequate and should be pulled down and replaced. A new building on Brook Hill was opened in 1903, designed by the architect John Dodsley Webster. The first X-ray machine and electric lights arrived in 1907 and a new operating theatre and electric radiators were installed in the 1920s. Two new wards were completed in 1927, a baby ward was opened in the 1930s and a second operating theatre was built in the 1950s. The accident and emergency department was extended in the 1970s and services were transferred from the Northern General Hospital in the 1990s.

During the 1990s it was featured in the BBC Television series Children's Hospital.

Local football club Sheffield Wednesday donated their shirt sponsorship to Sheffield Children's Hospital and the associated Children's Hospital Charity for the 2009–10 and 2010–11 seasons.

A new wing, built at a cost of £40 million, was completed in 2018. The new wing provides a new hospital main entrance, outpatients consulting suites, specialist diagnostic and treatment areas, and three new wards. The new wing was officially opened by Prince Harry in July 2019.

Research
The Sheffield Children's Clinical Research Facility (CCRF) opened in 2008 as the first dedicated CCRF in the UK. Research at Sheffield Children's NHS Foundation Trust spans a range of specialities including bone disease, genetics, respiratory disease, neurology, radiology, cancer and blood diseases, endocrinology and mental health. In 2012 the hospital received over £1 million in grants for research into the treatment of bronchiolitis, the use of vibration plate therapy to prevent fractures in children, and the development of bone scanning to replace X-rays in the study of bones in children.

See also
 List of hospitals in England

References

External links
Official site

Hospitals in Sheffield
NHS hospitals in England
Children's hospitals in the United Kingdom